Jones Bros Buffalo Ranch Wild West Show, and its successor Kit Carson Buffalo Ranch Wild West Show, was formed from the old Cole Bros. World Toured Shows (1906–09), owned by Martin Downs.  Cole Bros. World Toured Shows was not associated with the current Cole Bros. Circus or Clyde Beatty Cole Bros. except by name.

Formation
Shortly after the 1909 season Martin Downs was kicked by a horse and later died, and his show was put on the auction block in early 1910 by Fiss, Doer, and Carroll, New York horse dealers. The Billboard reported that 47 circus men attended the sale, all major shows being represented with the exception of Gollmar Bros. Largest buyer was J. Augustus Jones, who got a ticket wagon, calliope, bandwagons, chariots, cages, three tableaux, railroad cars, baggage stock. Other buyers were 101 Ranch, Ringling, Josie DeMott, Bartell Animal Co., Danny Robinson, Frank A. Robbins, Fred Buchanan, Andrew Downie, and Al F. Wheeler etc. W. E. Franklin and Walter L. Main were there but didn't buy anything. 

In 1910 J. Augustus Jones operated the "Jones Bros. Buffalo Ranch Wild West Show", a 14 car railroad show that traveled on 1 advance, 3 stock, 6 flats, and 4 coaches. 

After just one season Jones proceeded to sell his show. The December 10, 1910 Billboard reported that Thomas Wiedemann had purchased from Jones at Pulaski, Tennessee on November 12, some 29 horses, cars, wagons etc. and these were shipped to Wiedemann's quarters at Harrisburg, Illinois. The January 7, 1911 Billboard further reported that Jones had now sold all of his show except two sleepers, the equipment having been purchased by Downie & Wheeler, Masterson Shows, and Thomas Wiedemann. 

In 1911 Wiedemann used this equipment to start a Wild West Show called "Kit Carson Buffalo Ranch Wild West Show".  This was actually a combination circus and wild west show, and the performance was presented in a tent rather than the usual canvas canopy and open air arena type performance used by most wild west shows. The Kit Carson show had many circus-type acts. For 1911 one train inventory shows a total of 12 cars, 1 advance, 3 stocks, 5 flats, and 3 coaches. Another shows 14 cars, 1 advance, 3 stocks, 6 flats, and 4 coaches. (Both may be right, as it's possible the show enlarged entour.)  

In 1912 the Kit Carson show was on 17 cars, 1 advance car, 5 stocks, 5 coaches, and 6 flats.  After the 1913 season the show didn't go back to Harrisburg, Ill. quarters but wintered in Birmingham, Alabama, and opened the 1914 season in the South.

Closure
The Kit Carson show had the reputation of being a rough and tumble grift outfit, with plenty of "hey rubes" fights when the grifters were working. Some sources say that the strong grift was what finally closed the show. On Friday, October 23, 1914, at Harlan, Kentucky, the show was shot out of town by irate locals, and the next day, the show halted at Barboursville, Kentucky. Creditors had stepped into the picture, closed the show, and had a flyer shipped to the U. S. Printing & Litho. Co. plant at Cincinnati, Ohio, where it was advertised for auction. The stock was sold in December 1911, and March 20, 1915, was the time set for the sale of other properties at Cincinnati, except 5 cars and 12 wagons that were still stored at Harrisburg, but these were to be sold by description at the auction.  

The Kit Carson property at the sale went for very low prices. The Billboard states that the Dodson Carnival got the calliope (which may have been the instrument only) pole wagon, stage coach, 4 baggage wagons, blacksmith wagon, two tableaux, 1 stringer wagon, and a bandwagon. J. A. Jones, Harry Hill (Wild West), and Rice & Dore got other equipment. The report also goes on to say that "outsiders" got among other things, the ticket wagon, and one tableaux wagon.

See also
 List of Wild West shows

References
Bandwagon, Circus Historical Society, Sept-Oct 1957

Wild West shows